Seth Adam Meyers (born December 28, 1973) is an American comedian, television host, writer, producer, and actor. He currently hosts Late Night with Seth Meyers, a late-night talk show on NBC. Prior to Late Night, Meyers was a cast member and head writer for NBC's sketch comedy series Saturday Night Live from 2001 to 2014, and hosted the show's news parody segment, Weekend Update.

Early life and education
Meyers was born in Evanston, Illinois, and was raised in Okemos, Michigan, from four to ten years of age, and Bedford, New Hampshire, after that. Meyers's mother, Hilary Claire ( Olson), was a French teacher, and his father, Laurence Meyers Jr., worked in finance. His younger brother, Josh Meyers, is an actor and comedian.

His paternal grandfather was an Ashkenazi Jewish emigrant from Kalvarija near Marijampolė in modern-day Lithuania. The rest of his ancestry is Czech, Austrian, Croatian (from his paternal grandmother), Swedish (from his maternal grandfather), English, and German. Meyers discovered on the show Finding Your Roots that his family's original surname, Trakianski, was changed by his great-grandfather to Meyers, after his own father Mejer Trakianski.

Meyers attended Edgewood Elementary in Okemos. He graduated from Manchester High School West in New Hampshire. He graduated in 1996 from Northwestern University in Evanston (the town of his birth), where he became a member of the fraternity Phi Gamma Delta. His college roommate was fellow actor Peter Grosz. He majored in film and television production. In 2011, he was the Grand Marshal for the school's homecoming parade. In 2016, he delivered the commencement address at Northwestern's graduation.

Career
While attending college at Northwestern University, Meyers began performing improv comedy as a member of the Northwestern University improv sketch group Mee-Ow Show. He continued his career at ImprovOlympic with the group Preponderate as well as overseas as a cast member of Boom Chicago, an English language improv troupe based in Amsterdam, where his brother was also a cast member. When a Boom Chicago show he developed was mounted in Chicago, he was noticed by Saturday Night Live talent scouts and invited to audition.

Saturday Night Live
Meyers joined the Saturday Night Live cast in 2001. In 2005, he was promoted to writing supervisor, and in January 2006, he became co-head writer, sharing the role with Tina Fey and Andrew Steele. In 2004, he auditioned to co-anchor Weekend Update with Fey, but lost to Amy Poehler. With Fey's departure, Meyers became head writer for the 2006–2007 season and also assumed the role of Weekend Update co-anchor with Amy Poehler. In fall 2009, Meyers co-anchored two episodes of Saturday Night Live Weekend Update Thursday with Poehler. After Poehler's departure, Meyers anchored solo between 2008 and 2013. In the 2013–2014 season, Cecily Strong joined Meyers as co-anchor until his departure mid-season.

On SNL, Meyers impersonated such figures as John Kerry, Michael Caine, Anderson Cooper, Carrot Top, Prince Charles, Ryan Seacrest, Sean Penn, Stone Phillips, Tobey Maguire, Peyton Manning, Ben Curtis (also known as the Dell Dude), Ty Pennington, Bill Cowher, Brian Williams, Nicollette Sheridan, Wade Robson, Donald Trump, Jr., Tom Cruise, and Kevin Federline. His recurring characters included Zach Ricky, host of the kids' hidden camera show "Pranksters"; Nerod, the receptionist in the recurring sketch "Appalachian Emergency Room"; David Zinger, a scientist who often insults his fellow workers; DJ Johnathan Feinstein, the DJ on the webcam show "Jarett's Room"; Dan Needler, half of a married couple "that should be divorced," (opposite Amy Poehler); William Fitzpatrick, from the Irish talk show "Top o' the Morning," and Boston Powers (one of the comedians in the "Original Kings of Catchphrase Comedy" series). In the season 29 episode hosted by Lindsay Lohan, he portrayed Ron Weasley in a parody of Harry Potter.

Meyers received critical praise for his part in several iconic SNL sketches during his tenure. During the 2008 United States presidential election, Meyers wrote the sketches for former SNL cast member Tina Fey, who returned as a guest star to impersonate Republican vice presidential candidate Sarah Palin. Meyers created the famed phrase uttered by Fey's Palin, "I can see Russia from my house."

During their time as hosts on Weekend Update, Meyers and Poehler had a popular recurring bit, "Really!?! with Seth and Amy." Both hosts would take turns mocking people in the news, ending each point with a heavily sarcastic "Really!?!", which Rolling Stone writer Jon Blistein characterized as a "torrent of exasperation and bewilderment." Following Poehler's departure from the show in 2008, they revived the "Really!?!" segment several times when she returned as a guest. After Meyers left the show for his own talk show, Poehler made a surprise appearance on Late Night with Seth Meyers in June 2015 to join Meyers in mocking Sports Illustrated sportswriter Andy Benoit, after he disparaged women's sports as "not worth watching."

Additionally, the "Abe Lincoln" sketch Meyers wrote for Louis C.K., done in the style of his sitcom, Louie, and the Girls parody, starring Tina Fey as the new Albanian "girl", were praised by critics as among the best sketches Meyers contributed to SNL.

Meyers supported and picketed during the 2007–08 Writers Guild of America strike. When interviewed, he said, "We all know how lucky we are to have the jobs we have. We're not asking for much. You have to change the rules because people are watching TV in a different way." Even so, he mentioned in interviews that he regretted missing much of the presidential election primary season.

Meyers performed in his final episode of SNL February 1, 2014. Strong, Poehler, Bill Hader (in character as Stefon), Andy Samberg, and Fred Armisen (as former New York state governor David Paterson) joined him at the Weekend Update desk. Meyers returned to host the show in 2018, with Paul Simon as the musical guest.

Late Night

NBC announced on May 12, 2013, that Meyers would be the new host of Late Night in 2014, succeeding Jimmy Fallon, as Fallon became host of The Tonight Show. Meyers assumed his role on Late Night on February 24, 2014, and his first guest was former SNL castmate and Weekend Update anchor Amy Poehler. Meyers announced February 10, 2014, that the bandleader for his house band "The 8G Band" would be his former SNL colleague Fred Armisen. More recently, he and his Sethmaker Shoemeyers Productions company signed an overall deal with NBCUniversal.

Other pursuits
Meyers won the third season of Bravo's Celebrity Poker Showdown in 2004, and donated the $100,000 prize to the Boston-based Jimmy Fund. Meyers and SNL castmate Bill Hader penned a Spider-Man one-off entitled The Short Halloween. It was illustrated by Kevin Maguire and was published May 29, 2009. Benjamin Birdie of Comic Book Resources gave the work three and a half stars on a scale of five. Meyers, along with Mike Shoemaker of SNL, created an animated half-hour series titled The Awesomes, produced by Lorne Michaels' company, Broadway Video, that aired on Hulu.com beginning August 2013.

Awards hosting 
Meyers has hosted the Webby Awards twice, in 2008 and 2009. In 2009, Meyers hosted the Microsoft Company Meeting at Safeco Field in Seattle. Meyers hosted the 2010 and 2011 ESPY Awards on ESPN. In April 2011, Meyers was the keynote speaker at the White House Correspondents' Association Dinner. During his introductory remarks, he made a joke about Osama bin Laden's actions while in hiding; namely, that bin Laden was hosting his own afternoon television show on C-SPAN. Meyers was unaware that US intelligence had located bin Laden and the Navy SEALs planned an attack on his location for the next day. In the same speech, he mocked Donald Trump (who was in attendance) for his attempts in finding then US President Barack Obama's birth certificate. He also mocked Trump's intention of running for president, which many later jokingly said was the reason for Trump's later candidacy in the 2016 US Presidential Election. In 2014, Meyers hosted the 66th Primetime Emmy Awards. In 2018, Meyers hosted the 75th Golden Globe Awards.

Influences
Meyers has said that his comedy influences are David Letterman, Monty Python, Steve Martin, Dennis Miller, Mel Brooks, Woody Allen, Richard Pryor, P. G. Wodehouse, Conan O'Brien, and Jon Stewart.

Personal life
Meyers became engaged to his girlfriend of five years, attorney Alexi Ashe, in July 2013. The two married in a Jewish ceremony September 1, 2013, on Martha's Vineyard. Their first son, Ashe Olson Meyers (named after Meyers's wife's and mother's maiden names, respectively), was born at Lenox Hill Hospital on March 27, 2016. On April 8, 2018, the couple's second son, Axel Strahl Meyers, was delivered in the lobby of their apartment building. On November 24, 2021, he announced the birth of his daughter, Adelaide Ruth Meyers, during Late Nights Corrections segment.

While talking to Jake Tapper on the December 4, 2018, episode of Late Night with Seth Meyers, Meyers said that while he is not Jewish, his wife is; consequently, their children are being raised Jewish. Their son Axel's middle name Strahl is after the surname of his wife's Holocaust survivor grandparents.
Beginning in July 2013, Alexi Ashe worked as an Assistant District Attorney in Brooklyn, assigned to the Sex Crimes Bureau. She has since joined Sanctuary for Families as an advocate for victims of gender violence.

Meyers's children, dressed as "murder hornets", made a quick appearance during one COVID-19 episode of A Closer Look, filmed in the family's attic.

Meyers is a fan of the Boston Red Sox, the Boston Celtics, the Pittsburgh Steelers, the Pittsburgh Pirates, the Pittsburgh Penguins (his father being a Pittsburgh native), the Northwestern Wildcats (his alma mater), and two soccer teams, namely the Netherlands national football team and the Premier League club West Ham United. 

A fan of comics, he has cited Joe Hill's supernatural comic book series Locke & Key as one of his favorite comic book series. IDW Publishing gave him some of the replica keys they had licensed.

Filmography

Film

Television

Bibliography

Awards and nominations

References

External links

 
 
  in 2008
 Seth Meyers Late Night bio
 Live from New York: It's Sunday Afternoon!—conversation with Fred Armisen, Andy Samberg, Jason Sudeikis, Kenan Thompson, and Kristen Wiig at The New Yorker Festival, October 2010

1973 births
Living people
21st-century American comedians
21st-century American male actors
21st-century American non-fiction writers
Actors from Manchester, New Hampshire
American expatriates in the Netherlands
American male comedians
American male film actors
American male non-fiction writers
American male screenwriters
American male television actors
American male voice actors
American media critics
American people of Croatian descent
American people of Czech descent
American people of English descent
American people of German descent
American people of Lithuanian-Jewish descent
American people of Swedish descent
American satirists
American sketch comedians
American television talk show hosts
American television writers
Comedians from Illinois
Comedians from Michigan
Comedians from New Hampshire
Late night television talk show hosts
Late Night with Seth Meyers
Male actors from Illinois
Male actors from Michigan
Male actors from New Hampshire
American male television writers
The New Yorker people
Northwestern University School of Communication alumni
People from Okemos, Michigan
Primetime Emmy Award winners
Screenwriters from New Hampshire
Television personalities from Illinois
Television personalities from Michigan
Television personalities from New Hampshire
Writers from Evanston, Illinois
Writers from Manchester, New Hampshire
Writers from Michigan
21st-century American screenwriters
21st-century American male writers